Jean-Sébastien Gerard, born 1970, is a musician also known as Jess from Overlanders, who composed chiptunes for the Atari ST demoscene in the 90s.

Some of his chiptunes have been broadcast on Internet web radios, like scenemusic or CVGM.

He has contributed, along with many other chiptune composers, to the releases of famous Atari ST "MegaDemos". In the demo called "The Froggies Over the Fence" demo (released in 1993), all his chiptunes composed on the Atari ST computer can be listened in a special demo screen.

The scores of these chiptunes were written in Motorola 68000 Assembler language, not with the help of a graphical music editor. The program routines used to play the Yamaha YM2149 (soundchip in the Atari 1040STF) were all coded and optimized in Motorola 68000 Assembler language by Benjamin Gerard, born 1973, his brother.

Jean-Sébastien Gerard also composed soundtracks on Amiga 500, and afterwards on PC platforms. He also released "Arkanodeep" EP on Pro-Zak Trax French Electro Label in 2001, under the pseudo of Jess Lysen.

His entire music collection can be listened and downloaded freely on his personal web site Jess Music Vault.

References

Interview of Jean-Sébastien Gerard about Chiptune composing, made by Crown of Cryptoburners, 2001.

External links
 Froggies over the Fence review, 1993

1970 births
Chiptune musicians
Living people